Caibi is a municipality in the state of Santa Catarina in the South region of Brazil.

Caibi was settled in two waves. The first, in 1926, were settlers were gauchos from the municipality of Guaporé in the state of Rio Grande do Sul. The second, in 1930, were ethnic Germans from Siberia brought to the region by the Companhia Colonizadora Sul Brasil. The second group were refugees of First World War and sought new land to avoid the war. Many of the group desired to return to Paraná, but settled in the area permanently due to the difficulty of the voyage from Siberia. The German residents were unaccustomed to the food and climate of southern Brazil. Other settlers came to the area in the early part of the 20th century. In 1964 Caibi, a district of Palmitos, became a separate municipality.

References

See also
List of municipalities in Santa Catarina

Municipalities in Santa Catarina (state)